Prasat Phanom Wan, also locally known as Wat Phanom Wan is an unfinished ancient Khmer Hindu temple in the area of Mueang Nakhon Ratchasima District, Nakhon Ratchasima Province. It was first constructed as a Hindu temple and later adapted into a Buddhist temple, regarded as the fifth largest Khmer Hindu temple in Thailand.

It is believed that it was built in the 11th century. Later during the 13th-14th centuries, a stone building was built over it. It was the Hindu temple and later became a Buddhist temple. Although most of the place was ruined, the main prang (Khmer style stupa) and a tiered stupa are still remaining. The main stupa facing east was built of sandstone and was connected to the cloister by a square path of   length and  width. The stupa has three arched gateways. In the north gate, it enshrines a standing Buddha statue in the posture of forgiveness according to the Ayutthaya style.

The sanctuary is surrounded by laterite wall, the southwest area is a sandstone stupa called "Prang Noi" with the large Buddha statue inside. Outside the area comprises gopura (entrance) situated in the form of tall tower in four directions. The east side of the sanctuary features the trace of a baray (reservoir surrounding the Khmer Hindu temple is assumed to be a cosmic ocean in Hindu cosmology) and an earth hill.

There is also the pavilion to welcome Jayavarman VII or his representative who should have arrived at Phanom Wan in the 13th century to worship the Buddha statue.

Its Khmer style resembles Prasat Phimai in the same province but the size is smaller. It sited on the route between the Khorat (Nakhon Ratchasima City) and the Prasat Phimai. The sanctuary is now a recognised ancient monument in the year 1936 by the Fine Arts Department.

Gallery

References

Angkorian sites in Thailand
Buildings and structures in Nakhon Ratchasima province
Archaeological sites in Thailand
Registered ancient monuments in Thailand